The 2016 Olivet Comets football team, sometimes known as Team 116 in reference to the 116th season the Olivet football program had fielded a team, was an American football team that represented Olivet College during the 2016 NCAA Division III football season. The Comets play in the MIAA and played their home games at the Cutler Athletic Complex in Olivet, Michigan. Olivet was led by Dan Pifer, who was in his fifth and final season with the Comets, as he would be hired by the Walsh University football team of the G-MAC to become their new head coach in December 2016. In January 2017, offensive coordinator and recruiting coordinator Dan Musielewicz was hired as the new head coach for the Comets.

Season Synopsis

The Comets won the MIAA conference title outright for the first time since 1974 and at least a share of the conference title for the second consecutive year and the first time since 1913-1914. The title was the twelfth in school history and the nine wins in the season tied the single season record set in 2015. The Comets also made an appearance in the 2016 NCAA College Football Playoffs for the second time in school history, the other in 2007. Olivet faced John Carroll University in the First Round and lost to the Blue Streaks 37-12.

Broadcasting
For another season, broadcasting for the Comets was done by 89.1 The One WOCR FM with play-by-play done by sports director Matt Scher and color analysis by Zach Sturgill. The games could be heard on the radio and on wocrfm.com. A first for Olivet Football, home games were broadcast on the Comet Sports Network produced by Visual Premier Productions, LLC. with audio simulcasted from WOCR's broadcast. The Comet Sports Network broadcasts were streamed through YouTube.

Schedule

References

Olivet
Olivet Comets football seasons
Olivet Comets football